The 1996 Oklahoma Democratic presidential primary was held on March 12, 1996, as one of the Democratic Party's statewide nomination contests ahead of the 1996 presidential election. Incumbent President Bill Clinton easily won the primary, facing only minor opposition.

Results

References 

Oklahoma
1996 Oklahoma elections
Oklahoma Democratic primaries